Rossignol Wood (French Bois de Rossignol, or "Nightingale Wood") is a forest northeast of Hébuterne, France.  It is the site of a small World War I cemetery.

Village
Bois de Rossignol is also a small village known for Le Petit Chancon, a small tavern rated in one undated Guide Michelin with three crossed spoons and forks, and one star. The tavern was mentioned in Gerald Durrell's story "The Michelin Man" in his autobiographical book The Picnic And Suchlike Pandemonium.

References

External links
 Commonwealth War Graves Commission site
 http://www.ww1battlefields.co.uk/somme/gommecourt.html
 

World War I cemeteries in France
Commonwealth War Graves Commission cemeteries in France